The Liga ABF 2009–10 was the 53rd season of women's handball top flight in Spain since its establishment, running from 12 September 2010 to 15 May 2010. Fourteen teams took part in the championship, with CB Castro Urdiales and CBM Murcia replacing relegated teams CB Monóvar and CB Zuazo.

Defending champion SD Itxako won its second title, while EHF Cup runner-up CBF Elda was second and BM Sagunto, Mar Alicante and CB León also qualified for EHF's competitions. BM Gijón and CB Ribarroja were relegated, with the latter (CB Amadeo Tortajada's successor) being disbanded following the end of the season.

Teams by autonomy
  Mar Alicante, Elche, Elda, Ribarroja, Sagunto
  Castro Urdiales, Sagardía
  Goya Almería
  Gijón
  Bera Bera
  Remudas
  León
  Alcobendas
  Itxako

Table

References

División de Honor Femenina de Balonmano seasons
ABF
2009–10 domestic handball leagues
2009 in women's handball
2010 in women's handball